"Dance into the Light" is a 1996 song performed by English drummer, singer-songwriter, record producer, and actor Phil Collins, released as the first single from his sixth studio album, Dance into the Light (1996). It reached number nine on the UK Singles Chart, but was a disappointment on the US Billboard Hot 100, reaching number 45. B-sides are songs "Take Me Down" and "It's Over". The song also peaked within the top 10 in Czech Republic, Hungary and Scotland. On the Eurochart Hot 100, it reached number 29 in October 1996. The track was the only song from Dance into the Light to be featured on his compilation album ...Hits in 1998.

Critical reception
Swedish newspaper Aftonbladet described the song as a "bombastic light-reggae swing", adding it as an "absolute hit". AllMusic editor Stephen Thomas Erlewine said in his review of the Dance into the Light album, that the song "recalls the snappy punch" of Collins' 1985 song "Sussudio". Larry Flick from Billboard called it a "sunny and uptempo ditty that is awash in Caribbean-style horns and Stax-like pop beats." He felt that Collins "sounds like he is having an absolute blast here. In fact, you can almost hear the grin he must have been wearing in the recording studio shining through the music." The magazine's Paul Verna declared it as "peppy".

The Daily Vault's Christopher Thelen wrote that "Dance Into the Light" "with its different rhythm pattern, instantly engages the listener, and is one of the best singles Collins has written in a long time." David Browne from Entertainment Weekly stated that the singer "tries to broaden his palette", and added that "Afro-beat rhythms propel" the song, "which also tosses in politically correct references to South Africa." A reviewer from Music Week rated it four out of five, noting that Collins "returns with an uptempo ballad that bears his unmistakeable mark."

Music video
The accompanying music video for "Dance Into the Light" was directed by English musician and music video director Kevin Godley.

Track listing
"Dance into the Light" – 4:23
"Take Me Down" – 3:27
"It's Over" (Home Demo) – 4:22

Charts

Credits 
 Phil Collins – drums, percussion, vocals, kalimba
 Brad Cole – keyboards
 Daryl Stuermer – lead guitar
 Ronnie Caryl – rhythm guitar
 Nathan East – bass
 Amy Keys – backing vocals
 Arnold McCuller – backing vocals
 Vine Street Horns
 Andrew Woolfolk – saxophones
 Arturo Velasco – trombone
 Harry Kim – trumpet
 Daniel Fornero – trumpet
 Horns arranged by Harry Kim and Phil Collins

Notes

References

1996 singles
1996 songs
Phil Collins songs
Song recordings produced by Phil Collins
Song recordings produced by Hugh Padgham
Songs written by Phil Collins
Atlantic Records singles
Music videos directed by Kevin Godley